The 2019–20 NBL season was the 42nd season of the National Basketball League since its establishment in 1979.

Teams
Nine teams competed in the 2019–20 Season with the addition of South East Melbourne Phoenix.

Off-season changes

The South East Melbourne Phoenix joined the NBL.

Will Weaver replaced Andrew Gaze as head coach of the Sydney Kings.

Dan Shamir replaced Kevin Braswell as head coach of the New Zealand Breakers.

Matt Flinn replaced Rob Beveridge as head coach of the Illawarra Hawks.

Pre-season 

The pre-season games started on 19 June 2019 and ended on 16 October 2019. The pre-season featured games in China, the Philippines and the United States, and featured the NBLxNBA 2019 Tour in which five NBL teams played a total of seven games.

Ladder

NBL Blitz ladder

Regular season

The 2019–20 regular season took place over 20 rounds between 3 October 2019 and 16 February 2020.

Ladder

The NBL tie-breaker system as outlined in the NBL Rules and Regulations states that in the case of an identical win–loss record, the overall points percentage between the teams will determine order of seeding.

1Melbourne United won on overall points percentage. Brisbane Bullets finished 5th on overall points percentage.

Finals 

The 2020 NBL Finals were played in February and March 2020, consisting of two best-of-three semi-final series and a best-of-five Grand Final series. In the semi-finals, the higher seed hosted the first and third games. In the Grand Final, the higher seed hosts the first, third and fifth games.

Despite the threat of the COVID-19 pandemic and multiple other sporting events being cancelled due to the pandemic, the Grand Final series started on 8 March 2020. Beginning with Game 2, all remaining games would be played behind closed doors with no spectators. After Game 3, the Sydney Kings (who were trailing 2–1 in the series) announced that they would pull out of the Grand Final due to COVID-19 concerns. The NBL therefore cancelled the remainder of the series, and named the Perth Wildcats as NBL champions by default.

Playoff bracket

Awards

Pre-season
 Most Valuable Player (Ray Borner Medal): John Roberson (South East Melbourne Phoenix)
 3 Point Shootout: David Barlow (Melbourne United)
 Dunk Contest: Terry Armstrong (South East Melbourne Phoenix)

Regular season

Player of the Week

Awards night
 Most Valuable Player (Andrew Gaze Trophy): Bryce Cotton (Perth Wildcats)
 Rookie of the Year: LaMelo Ball (Illawarra Hawks)
 Best Defensive Player: D. J. Newbill (Cairns Taipans)
 Best Sixth Man: Jason Cadee (Brisbane Bullets)
 Most Improved Player: Will Magnay (Brisbane Bullets)
 Fans MVP: Scott Machado (Cairns Taipans)
 Coach of the Year (Lindsay Gaze Trophy): Mike Kelly (Cairns Taipans)
 Referee of the Year: Vaughan Mayberry
 GameTime by Kmart: Dane Pineau (South East Melbourne Phoenix)
 All-NBL First Team: 
 Scott Machado (Cairns Taipans)
 Bryce Cotton (Perth Wildcats) 
 Lamar Patterson (Brisbane Bullets) 
 Jae'Sean Tate (Sydney Kings) 
 Nick Kay (Perth Wildcats)
 All-NBL Second Team: 
 Casper Ware (Sydney Kings) 
 D. J. Newbill (Cairns Taipans) 
 Scotty Hopson (New Zealand Breakers) 
 Cameron Oliver (Cairns Taipans) 
 Andrew Bogut (Sydney Kings)

Post-season

 Semi-finals MVP: Nick Kay (Perth Wildcats), Jae'Sean Tate (Sydney Kings)
 Grand Final Series MVP (Larry Sengstock Medal): Bryce Cotton (Perth Wildcats)

Media

Australian Broadcast Rights to the 2019–20 season were held by SBS Viceland in the first year of a two-year deal. All 126 games were available live and free on streaming platforms such as SBS On Demand. ESPN also broadcast 59 games including all games after 7.30pm AEDT. In New Zealand, Sky Sport were the official league broadcaster. The NBL also became the first Australian sports body to broadcast their matches online with them signing a two-year deal with Twitch which included all pre-season games. The NBL also signed a deal with Facebook Watch, which broadcast 52 games across the season in the United States.

References

External links

 
Australia,NBL
2019–20 in Australian basketball
2019 in New Zealand basketball
2020 in New Zealand basketball